Mihoubi is a surname. Notable people with the surname include:

Ahmed Mihoubi (1924–2004), Algerian-born French footballer
Azzedine Mihoubi (born 1959), Algerian journalist, poet, novelist, and politician
Hemza Mihoubi (born 1986), Algerian-French footballer
Maroine Mihoubi (born 1999), French footballer